Spruce Island is an island in the Kodiak Archipelago of the Gulf of Alaska in the US state of Alaska. It lies just off the northeast corner of Kodiak Island, across the Narrow Strait.

Demographics
Spruce Island has a land area of 46.066 km2 (17.786 sq mi) and a population of 242 as of the 2000 census, mostly in its only city, Ouzinkie, in the southwestern part of the island.

History

From 1808 to 1818, Spruce Island was the hermitage of Herman of Alaska, later glorified as a saint and considered the patron saint of the Orthodox Church in the Americas. It was called New Valaam by St. Herman. The island is a site of pilgrimages by Orthodox Christians.

In 2008, researchers led by the mayor of the northern Siberian city  of Yakutsk alleged that the island should legally still belong to the Russian Orthodox Church because the Russian Empire had no authority to sell the church's land as part of the Alaska Purchase.

References

Islands of Alaska
Islands of the Kodiak Archipelago